KVHD-LD (channel 26) is a low-powered television station in Los Angeles, California, United States. The station is owned by the New York Spectrum Holding Company.

Digital channels

The station's digital signal is multiplexed:

References

VHD-LD
Low-power television stations in the United States